James J. Steen (November 19, 1876 – June 25, 1949) was an American water polo player who won a gold medal in the 1904 Summer Olympics as a member of the New York Athletic Club team.

References

External links
profile

1876 births
1949 deaths
American male water polo players
Water polo players at the 1904 Summer Olympics
Olympic gold medalists for the United States in water polo
Medalists at the 1904 Summer Olympics

ru:Водное поло на летних Олимпийских играх 1904#Составы команд